The company was formed from the merger of Ortho Pharmaceutical and McNeil Pharmaceutical in 1993.  Both of these pharmaceutical companies are pioneers and leaders in areas such as pain management, acid reflux disease, and infectious diseases. Ortho-McNeil and Janssen Pharmaceutica together compose the Ortho-McNeil-Janssen group within Johnson & Johnson.

Ortho-McNeil is headquartered in Raritan, New Jersey, United States.

Products
Amongst its many prescription drugs are:

Ortho Tri-cyclen
Ortho-Evra
Doribax
Elmiron
Levaquin
Ultram ER
Aciphex
Concerta

See also
 Biotech and pharmaceutical companies in the New York metropolitan area
 Cilag
 Janssen Pharmaceutica

External links
Official website

Johnson & Johnson subsidiaries
Pharmaceutical companies based in New Jersey
Companies based in New Jersey
Pharmaceutical companies established in 1993
American companies established in 1993